The United States national professional ballroom dance champions are crowned at the United States Dance Championships (formerly USDSC, and USBC), as recognized by the National Dance Council of America (NDCA) and the World Dance & DanceSport Council (WD&DSC).

The 10-dance division consists of International-style standard waltz, tango, Viennese waltz, foxtrot, quickstep and Latin cha-cha-cha, samba, rumba, paso doble, and jive.

U.S. National Champions

See also 
U.S. National Dancesport Champions (Professional Standard)
U.S. National Dancesport Champions (Professional Latin)
U.S. National Dancesport Champions (Professional Smooth)
U.S. National Dancesport Champions (Professional Rhythm)
U.S. National Dancesport Champions (Professional 9-Dance)
Dancesport World Champions (Ten Dance)
Dancesport World Champions (Professional Standard)
Dancesport World Champions (Professional Latin)

References

External links 
United States Dance Sport Championships (USDSC)
National Dance Council of America (NDCA)
Dancesport Competitions
Dancesport Info

Dancesport in the United States